In Greek mythology, Gorgophone ( "Gorgon-Slayer") was the name of two different women. 
Gorgophone, daughter of  Perseus.
 Gorgophone, a Libyan princess as one of the 50 Danaïdes. She married and murdered Proteus, son of King Aegyptus of Egypt, on their wedding night obeying the command of their father, King Danaus. Her mother was Elephantis and thus full sister of Hypermnestra, who saved her husband Lynceus and became the ancestress of the Argead dynasty.

Notes

References 

 Apollodorus, The Library with an English Translation by Sir James George Frazer, F.B.A., F.R.S. in 2 Volumes, Cambridge, MA, Harvard University Press; London, William Heinemann Ltd. 1921. ISBN 0-674-99135-4. Online version at the Perseus Digital Library. Greek text available from the same website.

Danaids
Women in Greek mythology
Characters in Greek mythology